A chaise, sometimes called chay or shay, is a light two- or four-wheeled traveling or pleasure carriage for one or two people with a folding hood or calash top. The name, in use in England before 1700, came from the French word "chaise" (meaning "chair") through a transference from a sedan-chair to a wheeled vehicle.

Design 

The two-wheeled version, usually of a chair-backed type, for one or two persons, also called a gig or one-horse shay, had a body hung on leather straps or thorough-braces and was usually drawn by one horse; a light chaise having two seats was a double chair.

A chaise-cart was a light carriage fitted with suspension, used for transporting lightweight goods.

A bath chair was a hooded and sometimes glassed wheeled chair used especially by invalids; it could be drawn by a horse or pushed by an attendant.

Other types of chaise included:

 post chaise : designed for fast long-distance travel
 curricle: two-wheeled, usually drawn by two horses
 calesín: small, one-horse, hooded, a seat behind for the driver, used in the Philippines
 shandrydan or shandradan: with a hood

During the winter of 1791/92, in the opening phases of the French Revolution, Henrietta Ponsonby, Countess of Bessborough, noted the lack of ostentation in the streets of Paris, where a few drove themselves about in "little open chaises like the cabriolet but with one horse."

See also 
Post chaise

References 

Carriages